Believers Never Die – Greatest Hits is the first greatest hits album by American rock band Fall Out Boy. Released on November 17, 2009 in the United States by Island Records, it contains all of the songs the band had released as singles to that point in their career,  in chronological order, as well as two new songs and two rarities. It is available as a CD or CD/DVD set with music videos. The album features an original wraparound illustration by artist Daniel Danger. The artwork was revealed on October 9.

Believers Never Die was released after Fall Out Boy toured as support for blink-182's 2009 summer reunion tour and shortly before Fall Out Boy announced an indefinite hiatus in late 2009. Of the two new songs, "Alpha Dog" was released as a single on October 26, 2009, and peaked at #60 in Australia. A demo version of it was on the Welcome to the New Administration mixtape, under the name "ALPHAdog and OMEGAlomaniac". Believers Never Die was generally received positively by critics. It appeared on the charts in some countries but its commercial success was limited. In 2013, the greatest hits set was followed up with Save Rock and Roll, the band's first studio album since Folie à Deux (2008). In February 2014, Believers Never Die was certified Silver in the UK by the BPI, and was upgraded to Gold in October 2015 for 100,000 copies shipped.

Album information
Believers Never Die - Greatest Hits debuted at No. 77 on the US Billboard 200 chart, finding its greatest success in Australia where it reached No. 25 on the Australian Albums Chart. In the UK, Believers Never Die peaked at No. 88 and was certified Silver by the British Phonographic Industry in 2013 for 60,000 shipments.

A limited edition CD/DVD version was released with the same album cover. It included the original CD as well as a DVD with most of the band's music videos. The DVD also features commentary from the members of the band on each video. The only official video by Fall Out Boy not included on this DVD is the music video for "Alpha Dog", which was released later. Neither the songs nor their respective videos for "The Carpal Tunnel of Love" and "Headfirst Slide Into Cooperstown On a Bad Bet" were included in Believers Never Die because they were not actually released as singles, contrary to popular misconception.

A music video for "Alpha Dog" was released on November 20, containing snippets of all of Fall Out Boy's previous music videos along with some images of photo shoots, autograph signings, and other activities not seen before on film. It begins with Pete Wentz saying that "no one should try this at home..."

Believers Never Die features two new songs, "Alpha Dog" and ""From Now on We Are Enemies"". In an interview, bassist Pete Wentz commented, "For the first new song 'Alpha Dog,' we had written like half of it and put [it on] our mixtape" as a demo to promote what would be the band's 2008 album Folie à Deux. "People really reacted to it, so we started to record over some of it. We saved a couple parts, and then we had to write the second verse and bridge. The other song, 'From Now On We Are Enemies', we wrote as a brand new song [...] The two new songs are different than any other Fall Out Boy songs. They seem like they could have been Folie à Deux B-sides, but they wouldn't have fit on the record. I'm not sure. They are the songs that have the most electronic stuff going on in them." "Yule Shoot Your Eye Out", one of the rarities, was a song taken from the compilation album A Santa Cause: It's a Punk Rock Christmas which contains songs by different bands, released in 2003; the last track and rarity is "Growing Up", a song from the band's 2002 Project Rocket / Fall Out Boy split EP. The version of "What a Catch, Donnie" on this album features lead vocalist/guitarist Patrick Stump singing the overture of "Headfirst Slide into Cooperstown on a Bad Bet". The original version of this song featured Elvis Costello singing the part, but was taken out of this release because Fall Out Boy's record company could not create a deal with his record label, Decca Records, in time.

Track listing

All songs written and composed by Fall Out Boy.

 Each video has an audio commentary by the band.

Album notes
 The album's artwork features an artistic rendition of the Lovers of Valdaro, a pair of 6,000-year-old adolescent skeletons found buried together. They would also be prominently featured on the album's sequel.
 On the last page of the album booklet it shows the website thefortysixthirtytwo.com, which contains a mosaic of names of the people who signed up to the site https://web.archive.org/web/20091208173858/http://www.intelligenceisartificial.com/ which Pete linked to from his blog https://web.archive.org/web/20091005012045/http://petewentz.com/post/202169707/dont-click-this-it-will-only-make-things-worse on October 1 with the warning "dont click this. it will only make things worse for some of us and better for the rest." This is a reference to his tweet saying: "4632: remember we warned you not to enter. thanks for everything over the years guys." on November 17(the day thefortysixthirtytwo.com went live and Believers Never Die came out).
 The last page also lists the website keepsmewarmatnight.com. The domain is taken, but strangely, the site does not exist. Some fans speculate that the website is related to the Secret Order, a club established in the band's early days known for being very exclusive, with details about its activities kept under lock and key. Upon release of the album, the website may have been taken down.
 A message is written on the inside spine of the CD case which reads ""ARE YOU WATCHING CLOSELY?"" This is a reference to Pete shouting out "Are you watching closely?" during the band's Honda Civic Tour in support of their 2007 album Infinity on High''.

Charts and certifications

Weekly charts

Year-end charts

Certifications

References

External links

Believers Never Die - Greatest Hits at YouTube (streamed copy where licensed)

2009 greatest hits albums
Fall Out Boy albums
2009 video albums
Music video compilation albums
Island Records compilation albums
Island Records video albums
Fall Out Boy video albums